The Copa del Rey 1914 was the 14th staging of the Copa del Rey, the Spanish football cup competition.

The Royal Spanish Football Federation took complete control of the cup tournament and decided that the clubs of the existing regional championship would qualify for the national cup championship; no free entry would be permitted anymore. Apart from some exception, the elimination rounds were played in two matches (home and away) from this season onwards. The competition started on 29 March 1914, and concluded on 10 May 1914, with the Final, held at the Estadio de Costorbe in Irun, in which Athletic Bilbao lifted the trophy for the 5th time ever with a 2–1 victory over España de Barcelona with Severino Zuazo netting both goals for Bilbao.

Teams
 North Region: Athletic Bilbao
 Center Region: Sociedad Gimnástica
Galicia: Real Vigo SC
 Catalonia: FC Espanya de Barcelona

Semifinals

First leg

Second leg

Athletic Bilbao won 14–3 on aggregate

España FC won 2–1 on aggregate

Final

Notes

References
LinguaSport.com
RSSSF.com

1914
1914 domestic association football cups
Copa